This is a list of firsts achieved in the colony and Commonwealth of Pennsylvania.

Firsts

17th Century
 1688 — First public protest of slavery in America, Germantown, (now part of Philadelphia)

18th Century
 1731 — First subscription library, Library Company of Philadelphia, founded by Benjamin Franklin
 1732 — First social club in the English-speaking world, the Schuylkill Fishing Company of the State in Schuylkill, Philadelphia
 1743 — First institution devoted to science, the American Philosophical Society, Philadelphia
 1748 — First dancing organization in America, the Philadelphia Dancing Assemblies
 1748 — First Lutheran church body in North America, the Pennsylvania Ministerium
 1751 — First hospital in America, the Pennsylvania Hospital 
 1754 — First (and only) surrender by George Washington, Fort Necessity
 1762 — First lectures on anatomy in North America, Dr. William Shippen, Philadelphia
 1765 — First medical school, Penn's Medical School (now The University of Pennsylvania), which made Penn the first educational institution to become a university in the United States, Philadelphia
 1766 — First organized hunting club in America, the Gloucester Fox Hunting Club near Philadelphia
 1774 — First continuously serving unit in the United States military, the First Troop Philadelphia City Cavalry
 1775 — Continental Marines founded, Tun Tavern, Philadelphia; now known as U.S. Marine Corps
 1777 — First United States Capital, Philadelphia. Philadelphia, Pennsylvania was the first capital under the First Continental Congress from September 5, 1774 to October 24, 1774. Philadelphia, Pennsylvania was the first capital under the Articles of Confederation from March 1, 1781 to June 21, 1783
 1780 — First abolition law, while the state capital was in Philadelphia
 1784 — First successful daily newspaper, The Pennsylvania Packet and Daily Advertiser, Philadelphia
 1786 — First vessel ever moved by steam, Delaware River at Philadelphia, by John Fitch
 1790 — First stock exchange in America, Philadelphia
 1792 — First United States Mint, Philadelphia
 1794 — First African Methodist Episcopal church, Mother Bethel A.M.E. Church, Philadelphia
 1795 — First turnpike in the United States, Philadelphia and Lancaster Turnpike
 1796 — First suspension bridge, Uniontown by James Finley

19th Century
 1805 — First art institution in America, the Pennsylvania Academy of the Fine Arts, Philadelphia
 1805 — First covered bridge in America, the Market Street Bridge (a.k.a. "the Permanent Bridge"), Philadelphia
 1809 — First theater in America, the Walnut Street Theatre, Philadelphia
 1816 — First wire cable suspension bridge, near Philadelphia, by Josiah White and Erskine Hazard
 1821 — First Pharmacy school, Philadelphia College of Pharmacy (now part of the University of the Sciences in Philadelphia)
 1845 — First T-rail rolled in United States, Danville
 1848 — First and only visual arts college for women in the United States, Moore College of Art & Design, Philadelphia
 1856 — First national convention for the Republican Party, Musical Fund Hall, Philadelphia
 1859 — First grand opera house in the United States still used for its original purpose, the Academy of Music, Philadelphia
 1859 — First  successful oil well, Titusville (Edwin L. Drake)
 1861 — First pretzel factory, Julius Sturgis, Lititz
 1863 — First Civil War battle north of the Mason–Dixon line, Hanover, J.E.B. Stuart vs. George Armstrong Custer
 1866 — First mill in the United States dedicated exclusively to the process of making steel, Steelton Plant, near Harrisburg
 1873 — First Roller Coaster, Jim Thorpe
 1874 — First zoo, Philadelphia (chartered in 1859)
 1876 — First World's Fair in the United States, the Centennial Exposition, Philadelphia
 1877 — First department store opened, Wanamaker's, Philadelphia
 1879 — First non-reservation school for Native Americans, Carlisle, Carlisle Indian School
 1881 — First community illuminated by electricity, Philipsburg
 1881 — First business school in the United States, the Wharton School
 1883 — First successful three-wire electric lighting system, Sunbury
 1884 — First taxi service, Philadelphia; First Ukrainian Greek Catholic church in the Western Hemisphere, Shenandoah.

20th Century
 1901 — First escalator in US, Philadelphia
 1903 — First World Series, Pittsburgh, Pittsburgh Pirates vs Boston Red Sox
 1913 — First coast-to-coast highway, Lincoln Highway
 1919 — First Thanksgiving Day Parade, Philadelphia
 1920 — First commercial radio station, KDKA (AM) (Pittsburgh)
 1922 — First municipal airport, Clarion, Parker D. Cramer airfield
 1922 — First women (eight, including Martha Gibbons Thomas) elected to serve in the Pennsylvania House of Representatives
 1924 — First woman to serve as Speaker of a State House of Representatives, Alice M. Bentley
 1932 — First totally air conditioned building, Philadelphia, PSFS Building
 1933 — First American-born bishop of the Eastern Orthodox Church, September 10, 1933, consecration of Benjamin (Basalyga) of Olyphant
 1933 — First baseball stadium built for a Black team, Pittsburgh, Greenlee Stadium
 1933 — First African-American woman to be elected a State Legislator, Crystal Bird Fauset
 1939 — First Little League Baseball game, June 6, Williamsport.
 1946 — First large-scale, electronic, digital computer capable of being reprogrammed to solve a full range of computing problems, ENIAC, at The University of Pennsylvania, Philadelphia
 1947 — First Little League World Series, Williamsport.
 1948 — First cable television system, Mahanoy City
 1952 — First indoor zoo - National Aviary, Pittsburgh
 1957 — First American commercial nuclear generator, Shippingport Atomic Power Station
 1970 — First African American female Secretary of State, Dr. C. DeLores Tucker, appointed under Gov. Milton Shapp
 1974 — First successful conjoined twin separation, Philadelphia, Clara and Altagracia Rodriguez, at Children's Hospital of Philadelphia
 1976 — First automotive bridge to be named for a woman, Betsy Ross Bridge, Philadelphia
 1976 — First museum for young children, The "Please Touch Museum for Children" in Philadelphia
 1977 — First African-American to serve as speaker of a state House of Representatives, K. Leroy Irvis of Pittsburgh
 1999 — First license plate with a web site address

21st Century
 2003 — First Secretary of the Department of Homeland Security, January 24, 2003, Tom Ridge
 2003 — First Puerto Rican Secretary of State in the United States, outside of the Commonwealth of Puerto Rico, April 2, 2003, Pedro A. Cortés
 2003 — First confirmed Latino Cabinet member, April 2, 2003, Pedro A. Cortés
 2021 — First openly transgender four-star officer in the nation's eight uniformed services, Rachel  Levine.

References

Firsts
Pennsylvania